Zale obliqua, the oblique zale, is a moth of the family Noctuidae. The species was first described by Achille Guenée in 1852. It is found in barrens and pine woodlands of the United States from Ohio to southern Maine, south to northern Florida, Mississippi and Texas.

The wingspan is 36–40 mm. Adults are on wing in late March in southeastern North Carolina and in early summer from New Jersey northward. There is one generation from New Jersey north. From eastern Maryland to northeastern North Carolina southward there are two generations.

They feed on pitch pine in the north and probably loblolly, pond, and longleaf pine in the south.

References

External links

"Oblique Zale (Zale obliqua)". Forest Pests. Archived October 31, 2007. With larval stage info.

Catocalinae
Moths described in 1852